The following Union Army units and commanders fought in the Atlanta campaign of the American Civil War. The Confederate order of battle is listed separately. Order of battle compiled from the army organization during the campaign.

This order of battle covers the period of May 7 – July 17, 1864.  The period July 17 – September 8, 1864, is listed separately.

Abbreviations used

Military rank
 MG = Major General
 BG = Brigadier General
 Col = Colonel
 Ltc = Lieutenant Colonel
 Maj = Major
 Cpt = Captain

Other
 w = wounded
 mw = mortally wounded
 k = killed

Military Division of the Mississippi

MG William T. Sherman
Chief of Staff: BG Joseph D. Webster
Chief of Artillery: BG William F. Barry
Headquarters Guard: 7th Company Ohio Sharpshooters: Lieut. William McCrory

Army of the Cumberland

MG George Henry Thomas
Chief of Artillery: BG John M. Brannan
Chief of Staff: BG William D. Whipple
Escort: Company I, 1st Ohio Cavalry: Lieut. Henry C. Reppert

IV Corps

MG Oliver O. Howard

XIV Corps

MG John M. Palmer

XX Corps

MG Joseph Hooker

Cavalry Corps
BG Washington Elliott, Chief of Cavalry, Army of the Cumberland

Army of the Tennessee

MG James B. McPherson
Escort: 4th Company Ohio Cavalry; Company B, 1st Ohio Cavalry

XV Corps

MG John A. Logan

XVI Corps

MG Grenville M. Dodge
Escort: 1st Alabama Cavalry; Company A, 52nd Illinois

XVII Corps

MG Francis P. Blair, Jr.
Escort: Company M, 1st Ohio Cavalry; Company G, 9th Illinois Mounted Infantry

Army of the Ohio (XXIII Corps)
MG John M. Schofield
BG Jacob Cox
Escort: Company G, 7th Ohio Cavalry

Strengths
The following table shows total strengths of each of the major formations at several stages throughout the campaign.

Notes

References
 U.S. War Department, The War of the Rebellion: a Compilation of the Official Records of the Union and Confederate Armies. Washington, DC: U.S. Government Printing Office, 1880–1901.
 Luvaas, Jay & Harold W. Nelson (eds.). Guide to the Atlanta Campaign: Rocky Face Ridge to Kennesaw Mountain (Lawrence, KS: University Press of Kansas), 2008.  

American Civil War orders of battle
Order of battle, Union